Delight is the first Japanese extended play of South Korean artist, Daesung, also known by his Japanese stage name, D-Lite, member and lead vocalist of boy band Big Bang. The album includes 9 versions of 4 songs, including 3 new enka songs, all of which recorded in Japanese. The album was released through 'Enka! Avex Produced by YGEX.'

Background and release
On September 18, 2014, YG Entertainment announced that Daesung will be releasing a concept album D-Lite on October 29 in celebration of year-end party season. The album will contain a total of nine tracks, including three new enka songs, the lead track will be "Look at me, GwiSoon", originally written by G-Dragon, but the Japanese lyrics will be written by Kenichi Maeyamada. The album contains songs under trot genre. The album will have CD, and a DVD include the music video for "Look at me, GwiSoon" and "Shut Up" as well as the summer episode of How to Enjoy Vacation in Hokkaido.

On the first day of release the album sold 65,048 copies in Japan, topping Oricon daily chart. The album sold total 71,000 in the first week of its release, topping Oricon Weekly Chart, and become the highest first week sale for Daesung.

Track listing

Charts

Sales

Release history

References

Avex Group EPs
YG Entertainment EPs
Daesung EPs
Albums produced by G-Dragon
2014 EPs